Nataliya Rybakova (born 24 June 1981) is a Kazakhstani speed skater. She competed in the women's 3000 metres at the 2006 Winter Olympics.

References

External links
 

1981 births
Living people
Kazakhstani female speed skaters
Olympic speed skaters of Kazakhstan
Speed skaters at the 2006 Winter Olympics
People from Petropavl
Speed skaters at the 2007 Asian Winter Games
Kazakhstani people of Russian descent